Rafael Ponce (born 22 June 1963) is one of the very few Ecuadorian professional golfers who has played on the international golf circuit. He has spent over a decade on the Asian Tour, where he has several top ten finishes. His professional wins include the 1995 Hugo Boss Open in China and the 2004 TLA Players Championship in Mexico, which was a Tour de las Américas event.

Professional wins (3)
This list may be incomplete

Tour de las Américas wins (2)
2004 TLA Players Championship
2007 Abierto Internacional de Golf del Eje Cafetero

China Tour wins (1)
1995 Hugo Boss Open (China)

References

Ecuadorian male golfers
Asian Tour golfers
1963 births
Living people